The Queen Elizabeth Story is a 1952 children's historical novel by Rosemary Sutcliff, originally published by Oxford University Press.

References

External links
 Blogsite on The Queen Elizabeth Story and all Rosemary Sutcliff books by her godchild and literary executor

1952 British novels
1952 children's books
British children's novels
Children's historical novels
Novels by Rosemary Sutcliff
Oxford University Press books
Cultural depictions of Elizabeth I